Sher Mohammad Marri was the chief of the Marri Baloch tribe in Pakistan, and an early leader in the Parrari movement which would lead to the formation of the Baloch Liberation Army, a militant nationalist group. A Marxist, he had close ties to leftist governments in Kabul and Moscow.

Life

Sher Muhammad Marri was born in Kohlu, Balochistan, British India in 1935. He was also known as Babu Shero, Shero Marri, General Sherof and Baloch Tiger.

Insurgency
Sher Mohammad was the first Baloch to use the tactics of modern guerrilla warfare against the government. In early 1960s his Parari fighters attacked the Pakistani Armed Forces in the Marri area and in Jahlawan under Mir Ali Muhammad Mengal. This campaign came to an end in 1967 with the declaration of a general amnesty.

In 1973, Marri was arrested for his role in the struggles against the government of Zulfikar Ali Bhutto. Upon his release in the late 1970s, Marri went into exile in Pakistan's Marxist neighbour, the Democratic Republic of Afghanistan. Following the fall of the Communist Afghan government in April 1992, Marri briefly returned to Pakistan but then he went to India. In his last few years, Sher Mohammad Marri saw the cause of Baloch nationalism evaporating. The Baloch nationalist movement was full of schisms and in a state of disarray. The Baloch nationalist became divided after a bitter dispute broke out between Sher Mohammad Marri and Khair Bakhsh Marri.

On 11 May 1993, Sher Mohammad Marri died in a hospital, in New Delhi, India.

References

Bibliography
 Interview of Sher Mohammad Marri, Sher Mohammad Marri and Ahmed Shuja, Pakistan Forum, Vol. 3, No. 8/9, Focus on Baluchistan (May - Jun., 1973), pp. 38–40, Middle East Research and Information Project
 Political Terrorism: A New Guide to Actors, Authors, Concepts, Data Bases, Theories, & Literature By Albert J. Jongman, Alex Peter Schmid, 

1935 births
1993 deaths
Baloch militants
Baloch nationalists
Pakistani guerrillas
Pakistani exiles